Bahonar may refer to:

 Mohammad Javad Bahonar, Prime Minister of Iran assassinated in 1981
 Mohammad Reza Bahonar, Deputy Speaker of Majlis of Iran, brother of Mohammad Javad Bahonar
 Bahonar, an Iranian placename

See also
Shahid Bahonar (disambiguation)